Gramsh is a town and a municipality in Elbasan County, central Albania. The municipality was formed at the 2015 local government reform by the merger of the former municipalities Gramsh, Kodovjat, Kukur, Kushovë, Lenie, Pishaj, Poroçan, Skënderbegas, Sult and Tunjë, that became municipal units. The seat of the municipality is the town Gramsh. The total population is 24,231 (2011 census), in a total area of 739.75 km2. The population of the former municipality at the 2011 census was 8,440.

The town is connected with Elbasan, Korça, Pogradec, Skrapar, Librazhd and Berat. The town is crossed by the river Devoll.

Etymology
During the Ottoman period and before the Albanian Declaration of Independence in 1912, it was known as Grameç in Turkish.

History
Gramsh has been inhabited since ancient times, as is confirmed by archaeological findings in the Tumulus of Cëruja.In the Middle Ages, the area was under the possession of Prince George Arianiti. During Ottoman rule, it was a kaza administrative division within the Sanjak of Elbasan of the Monastir Vilayet.In the 16th century it was reported as having 400 houses and 18 shops , the area also had around 500 active rebels who attacked the Ottomans from time to time.From 1912 until 1947, this was the center of Gramsh area. With the new administrative division, it became the center of Gramsh District, in which were placed various state institutions. Gramsh was declared a city on July 10, 1960. Since 1965, it has been a municipality.

Historically the southern part of the district was part of the ethnographic region of Tomorrica, and its population was primarily Bektashi, a Sufi order linked to Shiism, while the northern part of the district was more heavily Sunni, but there is also a Bektashi tekke in the town of Dushk, in the Sult municipality. There are also Orthodox Christians in addition to Muslims in the southeastern region of Lenie, especially in historically Aromanian towns such as Grabovë. There were ethnically Albanian Orthodox Christians from in the nearby Shpat region of the former Elbasan district, which borders Gramsh. Many of Gramsh's municipalities saw less than 50% of the population declare themselves for any religion, including Tunjë, Sult, Poroçan, Gramsh the city itself, and Kodovjat, as well as the neighboring Mollas region which is historically linked to Gramsh although it wasn't part of the municipality recently.

On 20 August 2022, Gramsh’s weapons factory was attacked by two Russians and one Ukrainian. The Albanian Police arrested the three suspects after.

Economy
The city was home of one of the main military weaponry factories during the communist era. Devolli Hydro Power started in 1980, but was left between work due to the death of communist leader Enver Hoxha, and the beginning of a Transitional period until the 1990s that culminated in the overthrow of that system.In October 2013, it was reported that the municipality debt was high and the municipality was close to bankruptcy due to poor management of funds by former mayor, Dritan Bici.

Sports
The football (soccer) club is KF Gramshi that is in the Albanian Second Division.

Notable people
Adriatik Llalla, General Prosecutor of Albania, Inspector General of HIDAA
Architect Kasemi, architect of the 16th century
Ismail Qemali Gramshi, signatory of the Albanian Declaration of Independence
Antonio Gramsci Arbereshe whose origin is Gramsh 
Lorenc Trashi, footballer
Erblira Bici, volleyball player
Hamza Bey Gramshi, Led a major revolt in Tomorricë in 1570 against the Ottoman Empire.

Twin towns – sister cities

Gramsh is twinned with:
 Plataci, Italy

References

 
Municipalities in Elbasan County
Administrative units of Gramsh, Elbasan
Towns in Albania